Don Bosco Fernandes (born 28 March 1990) is an Indian footballer who plays as a defender for Goan United FC in the Middlesex County Football League.

Career
Fernandes made his professional debut for Sporting Clube de Goa during their first match of the 2014–15 I-League season on 18 January 2015 against East Bengal. He started the match and played 62 minutes as Sporting Goa drew the match 1–1.

Career statistics

See also
 List of Indian football players in foreign leagues

References

1990 births
Living people
Footballers from Goa
Indian footballers
Association football defenders
Sporting Clube de Goa players
DSK Shivajians FC players
I-League players
Indian expatriate footballers
Expatriate footballers in England
Indian expatriate sportspeople in England
Indian expatriate sportspeople in the United Kingdom